Elections to Liverpool Town Council were held on Wednesday 1 November 1876. One third of the council seats were up for election, the term of office of each councillor being three years.

Ten of the sixteen wards were uncontested.

After the election, the composition of the council was:

Election result

Because of the large number of contested seats, these statistics should be read in that context.

Ward results

* - Retiring Councillor seeking re-election

Abercromby

Castle Street

Everton

Exchange

Great George

Lime Street

North Toxteth

Pitt Street

Rodney Street

St. Anne Street

St. Paul's

St. Peter's

Scotland

South Toxteth

Vauxhall

West Derby

By-elections

No. 8, Pitt Street, 23 April 1877

The death of Alderman William Barton was reported to the Council on 4 April 1877.

Councillor Henry Jennings (Conservative, Pitt Street, elected 1 November 1875) was elected by the Council as an Alderman on 9 April 1877.

This election was declared void on 27 June 1877 under the Corrupt Practices (Municipal Elections) Act 1872 and reported to the Council on 4 July 1877.
The election was re-run on 23rd Mar 1878

See also

 Liverpool City Council
 Liverpool Town Council elections 1835 - 1879
 Liverpool City Council elections 1880–present
 Mayors and Lord Mayors of Liverpool 1207 to present
 History of local government in England

References

1876
1876 English local elections
1870s in Liverpool